Vedastus Kyalakishaija Kyaruzi (1921-2012) was a Tanzanian diplomat and politician.

He attended the University of Edinburgh from which he was awarded a Diploma in Public health, and in 1964 was admitted (in absentia) a Member qua Physician of the Royal College of Physicians and Surgeons of Glasgow.

He played an active role in Tanganyika African Association and the formation of Tanganyika African National Union (TANU). 
From 1949 to 1961, he was government medical officer.
From 1950 to 1951, he was president of the Tanganyika African Association, before giving him the seat to Julius Nyerere, and was posted to Kingolwira Prison Hospital near Morogoro then to the even more remote Nzega. 
From 1961 to July 1962, he was the first Tanganyikan Permanent Representative to the United Nations.
From 1962 to 1963, after independence he was Permanent Secretary, External Affairs and Defence.
From 1963 to 1969, he was UNICEF director for Africa south of Sahara.

References

Tanzanian diplomats
Tanzanian physicians
1921 births
2012 deaths
Foreign ministers of Tanzania
Permanent Representatives of Tanzania to the United Nations
Tanzanian expatriates in the United Kingdom